Creagdhubhia is a monotypic genus of flies belonging to the family Mycetophilidae. The only species is Creagdhubhia mallochorum.

The species is found in Europe.

References

Mycetophilidae